The Acropolis International Tournament 1987 was the second edition of the Acropolis International Basketball Tournament. It was held from May 18 to May 20, 1987, at the SEF arena in Piraeus, Athens, Greece. The competition is played under FIBA rules as a round-robin tournament. The participating teams were the hosts, Greece, as well as Yugoslavia, Canada, and the Czechoslovakia.

The tournament featured famous international basketball players such as Nikos Galis, Dražen Petrović,  Vlade Divac, Toni Kukoč, Stanislav Kropilák, Stojko Vranković, Jay Triano, Panagiotis Giannakis and Panagiotis Fasoulas.

Participating teams

Standings 

|-bgcolor="gold"

|}

Results

Final standings

Statistics 
First Day:

Yugoslavia - Canada 101-90 (44-33)

YUGOSLAVIA: D. Petrović 22 (1), A. Petrović 6, Kukoč 8, Cvjetičanin 15 (3),  Vranković 2, Radovanović 8, Grbović 5, Radović 14 (2), Paspalj 18 (2), Divac 3, Rađa

CANADA: Clarke 2, Pasquale 11 (3), Tilleman 22 (4), Triano 17, Kristmanson 13, Tokarchuk 7, Mungar 13, Karpis 5, Jebbison

Greece - Czechoslovakia 95–81 (49-31)

GREECE: Galis 31, Giannakis 13 (2) Stavropoulos 7 (1), Kambouris 2, Filippou 14, Papadopoulos, Fasoulas 10, Andritsos 6, Romanidis 2, Linardos, Karatzas 6, Ioannou 4

CZECHOSLOVAKIA: Böhm 4, Kropilák 10, Okáč 4, Matický 4, Medvecky 5, Skála 8, Žuffa 17, Rajniak 6, Jelínek 8, Michalko 3 (1), Svitek 13

2nd Day:

Greece - Canada 111–105 (62-48)

GREECE: Galis 36, Giannakis 32 (4), Stavropoulos, Kambouris 2, Filippou 6, Fasoulas 7, Andritsos 6, Linardos 2, Karatzas 6, Romanidis 7, Ioannou 7

CANADA: Clarke 4, Pasquale 18 (2), Tilleman 20 (5), Triano 38 (4), Kristmanson 3, Tokarchuk, Mungar 14, Karpis 6, Biegler, Jebbison, Johansson 2

Yugoslavia - Czechoslovakia 104-78 (56-39)

YUGOSLAVIA: D. Petrović 21, A. Petrović 11 (3), Kukoč 11 (1), Cvjetičanin 7 (1),  Vranković 14, Grbović 10 (2), Radović 6 (1), Paspalj 9 (1), Divac 8, Rađa 2, Đorđević 5

CZECHOSLOVAKIA: Kropilák 5, Okáč 18, Matický 12, Medvecky 4, Skála 8, Žuffa 5, Rajniak 4, Jelínek 8, Michalko 5 (1), Svitek 9 (1)

3rd Day:

Canada - Czechoslovakia 79–86 (39-41)

CANADA: Pasquale 5, Tilleman 13 (3), Triano 44 (6), Tokarchuk 2, Mungar 9, Karpis 2, Biegler 2, Morris 2

CZECHOSLOVAKIA: Mašura, Böhm 5, Kropilák 24 (1), Okáč 5, Matický 6, Medvecky 9 (3), Skála, Žuffa 4, Rajniak 16 (2), Jelínek 5 (1), Svitek 12

Greece - Yugoslavia 88-101 (43-60)

GREECE: Galis 45, Giannakis 6 (2), Stavropoulos 5 (1), Kambouris, Filippou 8, Papadopoulos 1, Fasoulas 14, Andritsos 5 (1), Karatzas 1, Pedoulakis 3 (1), Ioannou

YUGOSLAVIA: D. Petrović 37 (6), A. Petrović 8 (2), Kukoč 2, Cvjetičanin 5, Vranković 2, Grbović 30 (6), Paspalj 9 (1), Divac 6, Đorđević 2, Rađa

Top Scorers

External links
Basket.gr Acropolis Cup History Search Results 

Acropolis International Basketball Tournament